Tony Hughes (born 12 March 1963) is a former Australian rules footballer who played with the Sydney Swans in the Victorian Football League (VFL).

Career
Hughes, recruited to Sydney from Albury, kicked two goals on his debut, against Essendon in the 11th round of the 1984 VFL season. He played again the following week against Melbourne, a 97-point loss, then lost his spot in the team and didn't make any more appearances that season.

In 1985 he played four games for Sydney, from rounds 12 to 15. This included a 22 disposal game when Sydney defeated Richmond at the SCG, for which he received a Brownlow Medal vote. Coach John Northey singled out Hughes's effort playing on Maurice Rioli as the highlight of the win.

References

External links

1963 births
Australian rules footballers from New South Wales
Sydney Swans players
Albury Football Club players
Living people